Argelato is an Italian comune in the Metropolitan City of Bologna. It comprises the hamlets of Argelato, Casadio, Funo, Malacappa, Volta Reno, San Donnino and San Giacomo, that are administratively divided into the main town (comprising also the hamlet of ) and the hamlets Casadio (comprising the village of Malacappa) and  Funo (comprising the village of ).

In the hamlet of Funo are a large railway station for good deliveries, industrial facilities (Guaber) and one of the largest gross sale centre in Europe (CenterGross - center for gross trade of Bologna), the second biggest in Italy after the CIS of Nola.

References

Cities and towns in Emilia-Romagna